Allan Robert Bell  (born 20 June 1947) is a Manx politician who was the Chief Minister of the Isle of Man, having been elected to that position on 11 October 2011. He was an Independent Member of the House of Keys for Ramsey from 1984 to September 2016, and served in several different ministerial roles. He was replaced as Chief Minister on 4 October 2016.

Early life and education
Bell was educated at Ramsey Grammar School. He was involved in banking and clothing retail prior to entering politics.

Political career
Bell was first elected to the House of Keys as an Independent representing Ramsey in a 1984 by-election and continued as such until 22 September 2016 when he did not seek re-election. He had first, unsuccessfully. contested Ramsey in 1976 as a candidate for Manx nationalist party Mec Vannin.

He served in numerous ministerial roles including Minister for Tourism and Transport, from 1986 to 1990, Minister of Tourism, Leisure and Transport, from 1990 to 1994, Minister of Industry, from 1991 to 1996, Minister of Home Affairs, from 1996 to 2001, Minister of the Treasury, from 2001 to 2010 and was the first Minister for Economic Development, from 2010 to 2011.

He was named as a central figure in the "corruption of the system of government" identified by Mount Murray Commission of Inquiry (2002-2003), referring to his time as Tourism Minister in the early 1990s.

Chief Minister
On 11 October 2011, Bell was elected Chief Minister of the Isle of Man, winning a clear majority over Liberal Vannin opponent Peter Karran. Bell was proposed by Eddie Teare and seconded by Laurence Skelly.

While Bell was Chief Minister in 2013, the government signed a deal involving a £1.3 million bail-out loan and property purchase for the hotel chain Sefton Group which Bell stated was a "small but decisive part" in "support[ing] the economy". After a legal review found the deal to be  "outside of government powers", Bell initially refused to accept the proffered resignation of the economic development minister, John Shimmin.

Bell was appointed Commander of the Order of the British Empire (CBE) in the 2016 Birthday Honours for public service to the Isle of Man.

Government positions
Minister of Tourism and Transport, 1986–90
Minister of Tourism, Leisure and Transport, 1990–94
Minister of Industry, 1991–96
Minister of Home Affairs, 1996–2001
Minister of the Treasury, 2001–10
Minister for Economic Development, 2010–11
Chief Minister of the Isle of Man, 2011–2016

Personal life
In a 2015 interview with The Guardian, Bell stated that "People know that I’m gay. I’ve never made a secret of it, but no one has ever asked me."

Retirement
On 1 August 2016, Bell announced that he was retiring after 37 years within Manx politics.

See also
List of LGBT heads of government
List of the first LGBT holders of political offices

References

1947 births
Chief Ministers of the Isle of Man
Gay politicians
Living people
Members of the House of Keys 1981–1986
Members of the House of Keys 1986–1991
Members of the House of Keys 1991–1996
Members of the House of Keys 1996–2001
Members of the House of Keys 2001–2006
Members of the House of Keys 2006–2011
Members of the House of Keys 2011–2016
LGBT heads of government
Commanders of the Order of the British Empire
21st-century LGBT people